
PUK may refer to:

Geographical
 PUK, or Busan–Gyeongnam Area, a metropolitan area in South Korea

Political
  or National Unity Party, an Albanian political party
 Patriotic Union of Kurdistan, a Kurdish political party

Technological
 Pin Unlock Key or personal unblocking code (PUC), a code used in GSM mobile phones
 PUK welding, a precision welding system used in the jewellery industry

People
 Niels Kristian Iversen or PUK, Danish speedway-rider

See also
 Puck (disambiguation)